A list of films produced in Brazil in 1936:

See also
 1936 in Brazil

External links
Brazilian films of 1936 at the Internet Movie Database

Brazil
1936
Films